Rani Suhanadi (7th-century), also known as Sohman Devi, was an Indian queen consort. She was married to first Rai Sahasi II of the Rai dynasty, and secondly to Chach of Aror, Maharaja of Sindh (r. 632-671). She is known for her role in the succession of her first husband, thus establishing a new dynasty.

Life 

She was first married to Rai Sahasi II. According to the traditional tale, she eventually became enamored of her husband's chancellor, Chach. Soon, she requested to be freed from a loveless (and childless) marriage, but met with Chach's rejection, arising of a desire to not incur the King's wrath and swerve further away from scriptural ideals of a Brahminic life.

Yet Chach accepted her request for providing company; they continued to meet more often and grew more close but within the accepted boundaries of social conventions. The King remained ignorant of their relationship, and Chach continued to gain unprecedented control in day-to-day affairs of the state.

Finally, after the demise of Sahasi II, Devi proposed that Chach exploit the opportunity to be the next king of Aror. Chach conceded to Devi's plan — but subject to consultation with "devoted servants" — and the news of his death was accordingly withheld when potential claimants to the throne were incited against each other in a fatal internecine warfare, that lasted a night. 

In the meanwhile, ample supporters from the elites were obtained and Devi proclaimed that a "shocked" Sahasi II, though recovering quickly, was unable to hold court and had appointed Chach as the caretaker ruler for his lifetime. Gifts were lavished on important persons to win their trust on the occasion. These state of affairs continued for about six months.

Sometime afterwards, the news of his death made way to Sahasi II's brother — Rai Mahrit, then ruler of Chittor — who claimed to be the rightful heir of the throne and mounted an unsuccessful (and fatal) military offensive against Chach. 

According to the traditional story, Chach, despite being ambiguous about the morality of taking on a legitimate successor, was coaxed by Devi's "shaming of his masculinity".  Post-battle, Chach had all but secured the throne with him commissioning triumphal arches and public feasts; soon, Devi had him declared as the heir to the throne, being a man of "unsurmountable intellect and bravery", and went on to marry him with the approval of the court.

Legacy
Because of the role Rani Suhanadi played in the succession struggle, the Brahman dynasty was established, in what was portrayed in Chachnama, as the intrigues of a femme fatale working in conjunction with a willing-yet-ethical apprentice. He would later have to subdue protracted resistance from Bachhera, a relative of Sahasi II and the governor (or vassal) of Multan province.

Notes

References

Indian queen consorts
7th-century Indian people
7th-century women